Rain Veideman (born 1 October 1991) is an Estonian professional basketball player for BC Tallinna Kalev of the Korvpalli Meistriliiga. He also represents the Estonian national basketball team internationally. Standing at a height of 1.92 m (6 ft 4 in), he primarily plays the shooting guard position.

Professional career
Veideman began playing basketball with sPORTKUNDA/Rakvere. He began his professional career in 2008, at the age of 17, with Kuremaa of the Korvpalli Meistriliiga. Kuremaa finished the 2008–09 season in last place, despite Veideman averaging 10.9 points per game.

In 2009, he transferred to Rakvere Tarvas. The team finished the 2009–10 season as runners-up, with Veideman averaging 15.1 points per game. He won the KML Best Young Player Award and was named to the All-KML Team.

In 2010, Veideman signed for the Estonian champions TÜ/Rock. In the 2010–11 season, Veideman averaged 15.6 points per game and once again won the Best Young Player Award. On 4 February 2012, Veideman was loaned to Bayreuth of the Basketball Bundesliga for the remainder of the season. In Germany, Veideman averaged 7.5 points per game as Bayreuth finished the 2011–12 season in 13th place. Veideman returned to TÜ/Rock for the 2012–13 season.

On 30 July 2013, Veideman signed for Kalev/Cramo. Kalev/Cramo won the 2013–14 Estonian League championship. Veideman averaged 9.2 points per game and was named to the All-KML Team. In the 2013–14 VTB United League season, Veideman averaged 8.7 points per game and was named Top Estonian Player of the league. He averaged 11.7 points per game in the 2014–15 VTB United League season and was named Top Estonian Player for the second time. Veideman won his second Estonian Championship in the 2015–16 season, after Kalev/Cramo defeated TÜ/Rock in the finals, winning the series 4 games to 1.

On 5 March 2017, Veideman left Kalev/Cramo and signed for G.S.A. Udine of the Serie A2. He stayed with the team for the next season. Veideman returned to Estonia in the beginning of 2018–19 season and signed with AVIS Utilitas Rapla. In December 2018 he signed with Pompea Mantovana and returned to Italian Serie A2. He scored 28 points in 30 minutes on his debut against Hertz Cagliari. He started the 2019–20 season in his hometown club Rakvere Tarvas. In December 2019 Veideman started his third stint in Italy as he signed with Serie A2 team Eurobasket Roma.

On 11 August 2021, Veideman signed with KK Viimsi of the Latvian-Estonian Basketball League.

Estonian national team
Veideman was a member of the Estonian national under-18 basketball team that competed at the 2008 FIBA Europe Under-18 Championship and finished the tournament last, in 16th place.

As a member of the senior Estonian national basketball team, Veideman competed at the EuroBasket 2015, averaging 10 points, 5.4 rebounds and 4 assists per game, in 32.6 minutes. Estonia finished the tournament in 20th place.

Veideman was named captain of the national team for the EuroBasket 2017 qualifiers.

Awards and accomplishments

Professional career
TÜ/Rock
 2× Estonian Cup champion: 2010, 2011
 BBL Cup champion: 2010
Kalev/Cramo
 2× Estonian League champion: 2014, 2016
 2× Estonian Cup champion: 2015, 2016

Individual
 2× KML Best Young Player Award: 2010, 2011
 2× All-KML Team: 2010, 2014
 2× VTB United League Top Estonian Player: 2014, 2015
 KML All-Star: 2017
 KML All-Star MVP: 2017

Career statistics

Domestic leagues

Estonia national team

|-
| style="text-align:left;"| 2007
| style="text-align:left;"| 2007 U-16 European Championship Division B
| style="text-align:left;"| Estonia U-16
| 7 || 6 || 22.9 || .429 || .273 || .760 || 3.1 || 1.3 || 2.0 || .1 || 12.6
|-
| style="text-align:left;"| 2008
| style="text-align:left;"| 2008 U-18 European Championship
| style="text-align:left;"| Estonia U-18
| 6 || 4 || 26.2 || .426 || .273 || .844 || 3.8 || 1.2 || 2.0 || .3 || 13.2
|-
| style="text-align:left;"| 2009
| style="text-align:left;"| 2009 U-18 European Championship Division B
| style="text-align:left;"| Estonia U-18
| 8 || 7 || 31.4 || .536 || .325 || .857 || 3.0 || 2.3 || 2.1 || .0 || 18.9
|-
| style="text-align:left;"| 2010–11
| style="text-align:left;"| EuroBasket 2011 Division B
| style="text-align:left;"| Estonia
| 6 || 1 || 22.5 || .431 || .455 || .889 || 1.3 || 1.7 || .8 || .2 || 11.3
|-
| style="text-align:left;"| 2011
| style="text-align:left;"| 2011 U-20 European Championship Division B
| style="text-align:left;"| Estonia U-20
| 9 || 9 || 32.0 || .523 || .342 || .789 || 4.0 || 3.6 || 3.0 || .1 || 17.2
|-
| style="text-align:left;"| 2012
| style="text-align:left;"| EuroBasket 2013 Qualification
| style="text-align:left;"| Estonia
| 1 || 0 || 4.0 || .000 || .000 || .000 || .0 || 1.0 || .0 || .0 || .0
|-
| style="text-align:left;"| 2013
| style="text-align:left;"| EuroBasket 2015 First Qualification Round
| style="text-align:left;"| Estonia
| 7 || 0 || 22.7 || .561 || .500 || .455 || 1.9 || 1.3 || .6 || .3 || 11.4
|-
| style="text-align:left;"| 2015
| style="text-align:left;"| EuroBasket 2015
| style="text-align:left;"| Estonia
| 5 || 4 || 32.6 || .381 || .333 || .923 || 5.4 || 4.0 || .4 || .0 || 10.0
|-
| style="text-align:left;"| 2016
| style="text-align:left;"| EuroBasket 2017 Qualification
| style="text-align:left;"| Estonia
| 6 || 6 || 32.0 || .451 || .308 || .852 || 3.8 || 4.3 || 1.5 || .2 || 15.8
|-
| style="text-align:left;"| 2017
| style="text-align:left;"| 2019 Basketball World Cup Pre-Qualifiers
| style="text-align:left;"| Estonia
| 4 || 2 || 32.2 || .431 || .273 || .688 || 2.5 || 2.8 || 1.3 || .3 || 15.3
|-
| style="text-align:left;"| 2017–19
| style="text-align:left;"| 2019 Basketball World Cup Qualification
| style="text-align:left;"| Estonia
| 8 || 3 || 26.0 || .297 || .167 || .650 || 2.8 || 3.6 || 1.0 || .0 || 6.9

References

External links
 Rain Veideman at basket.ee 
 Rain Veideman at fiba.com

1991 births
Living people
BC Kalev/Cramo players
BC Rakvere Tarvas players
Estonian expatriate basketball people in Germany
Estonian expatriate basketball people in Italy
Estonian men's basketball players
Korvpalli Meistriliiga players
Pallacanestro Mantovana players
Pallalcesto Amatori Udine players
People from Haljala Parish
Rapla KK players
Rostock Seawolves players
Shooting guards
University of Tartu basketball team players